The Reckitt Baronetcy, of Swanland Manor in the Parish of North Ferriby in the East Riding of the County of York, was a title in the Baronetage of the United Kingdom. It was created on 17 July 1894 for the businessman and philanthropist James Reckitt. The second Baronet sat as member of parliament for Pontefract and Brigg. The title became extinct on the death of the third Baronet in 1944.

Reckitt baronets, of Swanland Manor (1894)
Sir James Reckitt, 1st Baronet (1833–1924)
Sir Harold James Reckitt, 2nd Baronet (1868–1930)
Sir Bealby Reckitt, 3rd Baronet (1873–1944)

References

Extinct baronetcies in the Baronetage of the United Kingdom
Reckitt family